was a Japanese popular music (ryūkōka) singer. At of the end of World War II, she was one of the most popular female singers in Japan, competing with Hamako Watanabe and Noriko Awaya. In addition, she took part in the Kōhaku Uta Gassen, one of Japan's most famous annual musical television shows, ten times.

Biography
She was born in the city of Hiroshima, and raised in Miyoshi city, Hiroshima Prefecture. She graduated from the Tokyo Music School. Impressed by Takeo Masunaga (also known as Ichiro Fujiyama) at a performance held by the music school, she debuted in 1936. Her famous song  was released in 1939. On August 6, 1945, she narrowly avoided the atomic bombing of Hiroshima because she was riding a train traveling through a tunnel at the time of the explosion.

She ceased activity as a singer in 2003, and retired in Hiroshima Prefecture. She died in Hiroshima on August 16, 2011.

Discography 
 : 1936
 : 1937
 : 1939
 : 1940
 : 1946
 : 1946
 : 1948
 : 1949
 : 1950

References

External links

1915 births
2011 deaths
Hibakusha
Tokyo Music School alumni
Musicians from Hiroshima
20th-century Japanese musicians
20th-century Japanese women singers
20th-century Japanese singers